Kang Seo-kyung is a South Korean former tennis player.

Kang has a career-high singles ranking of 560, achieved on 9 September 2013. She also has a career-high WTA doubles ranking of 484, reached on 31 October 2011.

Kang made her WTA Tour doubles main-draw debut at the 2014 Korea Open partnering Hong Seung-yeon.

ITF Circuit finals

Singles: 2 (1–1)

Doubles: 15 (6–9)

External links
 
 
 

1989 births
Living people
South Korean female tennis players
Sportspeople from Daejeon
Tennis players from Seoul
Tennis players at the 2018 Asian Games
Asian Games competitors for South Korea
20th-century South Korean women
21st-century South Korean women